In Greek mythology, Onthyrius or Onthyrios (Ancient Greek: Ὀνθυρίου) was the satyr who joined the army of Dionysus in his campaign against India. He was struck on his brow by Tectaphus with a pitiless blade.

Note

References 

 Nonnus of Panopolis, Dionysiaca translated by William Henry Denham Rouse (1863-1950), from the Loeb Classical Library, Cambridge, MA, Harvard University Press, 1940. Online version at the Topos Text Project.
 Nonnus of Panopolis, Dionysiaca. 3 Vols. W.H.D. Rouse. Cambridge, MA., Harvard University Press; London, William Heinemann, Ltd. 1940-1942. Greek text available at the Perseus Digital Library.

Characters in Greek mythology